Clive is a given name and surname (the article includes a list of people and fictional characters with the name).

Clive may also refer to:

Places
 Clive, New South Wales, Australia
 Clive County, New South Wales, Australia
 Clive, Alberta, Canada
 Clive, New Zealand
 Clive (New Zealand electorate)
 Clive River, in Hawke's Bay, New Zealand
 Clive, Cheshire, a location in England, UK
 Clive, Shropshire, England, UK
 Clive, Iowa, U.S.
 Clive, Utah, U.S.

Rivers
Clive River, New Zealand

Other uses
 Clive, an East India Company ship that carried explorer Francis Light to the east
 HMIS Clive (L79), a Royal Indian Navy sloop which served in the Second World War
 Baron Clive and Viscount Clive, subsidiary titles of the Earl of Powis

See also

Clive of India (Robert Clive, 1st Baron Clive, 1725–1774), the first British Governor of the Bengal Presidency